Hans Dobbertin (April 17, 1952 – February 2, 2006) was a German cryptographer who is best known for his work on cryptanalysis of the MD4, MD5, and original RIPEMD hash functions, and for his part in the design of the new version of the RIPEMD hash function. He was a member of the German Federal Office for Information Security (Bundesamt für Sicherheit in der Informationstechnik, BSI) and professor at the Ruhr University in Bochum.

External links
IACR obituary

1952 births
2006 deaths
Modern cryptographers